Fus or FUS may refer to:

 FUS (gene) ("Fused In Sarcoma"), a gene encoding an RNA-binding protein found in human cancers and several neurodegenerative diseases
 Fath Union Sport, a football club in Rabat, Morocco
 Feline urologic syndrome, any disease affecting the bladder or urethra of a cat
 Field Upgrade Software, software package for embedded systems which can include a bootloader and drivers.
 Fire Underwriters Survey, a Canadian risk management company
 First Unitarian Society of Madison, a church in Madison, Wisconsin, United States
 Focused ultrasound (High-intensity focused ultrasound), a therapeutic technique
 Franciscan University of Steubenville, a private Catholic university in Steubenville, Ohio, United States
 Franklin University Switzerland, a private liberal arts university in Lugano, Switzerland
 Frente Único Socialista (Socialist Single Front) (1938), a temporary political alliance in Bolivia